Dušan Jajić (born 4 July 1998) is a Swedish footballer who plays as a midfielder for Västerås.

Club career

IFK Haninge/Brandbergen
Raised in the Stockholm suburb Jordbro, Jajić started his career at local club IFK Haninge/Brandbergen where he made his senior debut in 2013 at age fifteen. This in the fifth tier of Swedish football, Division 3 Södra Svealand.

During his first years in senior football Jajić went on trials abroad at both Arsenal and Atalanta.

Hammarby IF
In early 2015 he got invited to train with Hammarby IF, and in March the same year he signed a three-year contract with the Allsvenskan club.

During his first year at the club, he initially played with the club’s U19 and U21 teams, but made his competitive senior debut in Allsvenskan against Åtvidabergs FF on October 2. Aged seventeen, he made his first start for the club on the last game day of the 2015 season in Hammarby's 2–1 away loss against Halmstads BK.

He would make another 3 appearances in Allsvenskan for Hammarby during the 2016 season, whilst also enjoying a short loan stint to their affiliated club Enskede IK in the Swedish third tier.

On 17 March 2017, he signed a new three-year deal with Hammarby. In the beginning of the season, Jajić appeared in all 3 of Hammarby's games in the group stage of Svenska Cupen. Midway through the season, on 21 July 2017, after only appearing in 3 league games, Jajić went out on a six-month loan to IK Frej in Superettan. Jajić also spent the vast majority of the 2018 season on loan at IK Frej, scoring 9 goals in 29 league appearances in the Swedish second tier.

Brommapojkarna
On 9 March, Jajić transferred to IF Brommapojkarna, newly relegated to Superettan. He signed a three-year deal with the club.

Vendsyssel FF
On 16 January 2020 it was confirmed, that Jajić had joined Danish 1st Division club Vendsyssel FF on a contract until the summer 2023.

International career
He is of Serbian descent through his parents. Jajić once considered representing the country on an international level, but states that he never was approached by the Serbian football association.

Instead, Dušan Jajić played 21 games for Sweden U17 between 2013 and 2015, where he at a regular basis also captained the side.

As of the 2016 season he is a member of the Sweden U19 team. He scored his first international goal in a friendly against Slovakia U19 in September 2015. The game finished 2-2 with Jajic opening the score tally. Jajić captained his country during the 2017 UEFA European Under-19 Championship, where Sweden finished last in its group following two losses in even games against Czech Republic and Georgia, and a surprising 2–2 draw against Portugal.

Career statistics

Club

References

External links
 

1998 births
Living people
Association football midfielders
Swedish footballers
Swedish expatriate footballers
Sweden youth international footballers
Allsvenskan players
Superettan players
Hammarby Fotboll players
Enskede IK players
IK Frej players
IF Brommapojkarna players
Vendsyssel FF players
Västerås SK Fotboll players
Swedish people of Serbian descent
Swedish expatriate sportspeople in Denmark
Expatriate men's footballers in Denmark
Footballers from Stockholm